Aconit was a unique frigate built for the French Navy during the Cold War, in commission from 1973 until 1997. She was named after the corvette  which fought in the Free French Naval Forces during World War II.

Development and design
The Type C65 corvette was built to counter the improved performance of submarines in the 1960s, and was designed around two recently developed systems: the DUBV43 towed active sonar, and the Malafon anti-submarine missile. The lack of facilities for landing helicopters was considered a significant drawback, and she was the last major warship built in France without them. Eventually the C65 programme, in which five ships were planned, was cancelled.

Service history
Aconit was laid down at the Arsenal de Lorient on 22 March 1968, launched on 7 March 1970 and commissioned on 30 March 1973. She was initially based at Toulon before transferring to Brest in 1975, having changed her pennant number from F703 to D609 on 1 January 1974.

The ship received several upgrades during her lifetime. In the 1970s she was fitted with the ARBR-16 radar detector and two Syllex chaff launchers. In 1984–85 she underwent a Indisponibilité pour Entretien et Réparations ("Unavailability for Maintenance and Repairs") during which the 305 mm anti-submarine mortar was replaced by eight Exocet MM40 missiles, and the DRBV-13 radar in the radome upgraded to the DRBV-15A.

In 1988 she was re-designated a Type F65 frigate.

Another IPER in 1992 added the DSBV62C towed passive sonar, two Oerlikon 20 mm cannon, two 12.7 mm machine guns, and the Inmarsat and Syracuse satellite telecommunications systems. In addition, the Decca 1226 navigation radar was replaced with the DRBN34A, and the DRBC-32B radar was upgraded to the DRBC-32D.

Scheduled to be in service until 2004, she was decommissioned on 27 February 1997 as part of a Fleet Reduction Programme. As of 2010 she was laid up at the French Navy "graveyard" at Lanvéoc awaiting demolition.

Notes

References
 Gardiner, Robert; Chumbley, Stephen & Budzbon, Przemysław (1995). Conway's All the World's Fighting Ships 1947-1995. Annapolis, Maryland: Naval Institute Press. .

Further reading

External links
 
 

1970 ships
Cold War frigates of France
Ships built in France